Burkinabè Fulfulde: Burkinabè) may refer to:
 Something of, from, or related to Burkina Faso, a nation in West Africa
 A person from Burkina Faso, or of Burkinabe descent. For information about the Burkinabè people, see:
 Demographics of Burkina Faso
 Culture of Burkina Faso
 List of Burkinabès
 Burkinabè cuisine

See also 
 

Burkina Faso
Language and nationality disambiguation pages
Demonyms